Looking Forward Looking Back is the 56th studio album by Australian country music singer-songwriter (1927-2003), Slim Dusty. The album was Dusty's 100th album release.

Looking Forward Looking Back was celebrated with a special Network 9 This Is Your Life event presentation by Mike Munro.

At the ARIA Music Awards of 2001, the album won the ARIA Award for Best Country Album. The album was also nominated for Highest Selling Album.

Reception

Track listing

Personnel
Slim Dusty - vocals

The Travelling Country Band

Robbie Souter - drums
Rod Coe - bass
Jeff Mercer - acoustic guitar, electric guitar, baritone guitar, dobro, harmony vocals
Mike Kerin - fiddle, acoustic guitar on "Never Was At All", vocals on "Bad Days Fishing"

Additional musicians

Tim Wedde - piano, organ, accordion
Michel Rose - pedal steel guitar on "Memories and Dreams" and "Good Heavens Above"
Lawrie Minson - harmonica on "Bad Days Fishing" and "Clean Up Our Own Backyard"
Colin Watson - electric guitar on "Gods Heavens Above", string arrangement
Jeff McCormack - bass on "Port Augusta", "Rainbow Over The Rock" and "Memories and Dreams"
Peter Denahy - fiddle on "The Bloke Who Serves The Beer"
Matt Fell - keyboard, mellotron, bass, electric guitar, mandolin, percussion on "Matilda No More"
Mark Punch - percussion on "Looking Forward Looking Back" and "Rainbow Over The Rock"
Phil Hartl - string leader
Kasey Chambers - guest vocals on "Matilda No More"

Charts
Looking Forward Looking Back debuted at number 5 in the Australian album charts and peaked at number 3 in September 2000.

Weekly charts

Year-end charts

Certifications

Release history

References

Slim Dusty albums
2000 albums
EMI Records albums